Kebira is a genus of sponges belonging to the family Lelapiidae.

The species of this genus are found in Southern Africa.

Species:

Kebira tetractinifera 
Kebira uteoides

References

Leucosolenida
Sponge genera